Hassan Massoudy (حسن المسعود الخطاط), born in 1944, is an Iraqi painter and calligrapher, considered by the French writer Michel Tournier as the "greatest living Calligrapher", currently lives in Paris. His work has influenced a generation of calligraffiti artists.

Early life 
Hassan Massoudy was born in 1944 in Najaf, central Iraq, and grew up in a traditional society. He moved to Baghdad in 1961, where he was apprenticed to various calligraphers and exhibited a talent for classic Arabic calligraphy.

Career 

In 1969 he fled Iraq for France, and after arriving in Paris in 1969, he entered the École des Beaux-Arts where he studied figurative painting. However, he continued to work on calligraphy and paid for his studies, by doing headlines in calligraphy for Arabic magazines.

In 1972, he created, with the actor Guy Jacquet and later the musician Fawzi Al Aiedy, Arabesque, a public performance combining music, poetry and live calligraphies projected on a screen .

He collaborated with couturier Azzedine Alaïa for his Autumn-Winter collection 1986/1987.

In 1995, he was involved in the design of the stage set for the ballet "Selim" with the dancer Kader Belarbi from the Opera de Paris and the singer Houria Aichi on a choreography from Kalemenis.

In 2005 he met the dancer and choreographer Carolyn Carlson, and the musician Kudsi Erguner. Together with three other dancers and three other musicians, they created the show "Metaphore", a harmony of music, dance and calligraphy. Massoudy has continued to live in France.

Influence
Massoudy has become an important influence on a generation of calligraffiti artists. The Tunisian street artist, el Seed, who uses calligraphy in his art, points to the work of Iraqi painter, Hassan Massoudy as a major source of inspiration, noting that "The work of Hassan Massoudy was totally out of anything I’ve seen from the way he shapes the letters to the colors he uses. He completely revolutionized the art of calligraphy."

Work 
Massoudy often uses quotations from classic and modern writers as the inspiration for his work. One such work is Woman is a Ray of Divine Light painted in 1987, which is based on the words of a 13th-century Sufi poet, Rumi. For Massoudy, reproducing a poem in calligraphy means more than simply presenting it in a particular style, rather it enables him to grasp the inner meaning of the words.

Massoudy explains:
 [The calligrapher must] assimilate all aspects of culture that relate to [his art]. Practice awakens the knowledge gradually stored up in the body and releases the expression of a myriad of nuances. [Calligraphic] codes serve to control the internal excitement and prevent his feelings from overflowing... but the calligrapher must pass beyond these set rules. To achieve his aim, he must first conform to these restrictions, and then go beyond them. This is because a true calligraphic composition must contain something indefinable, something elusive and powerful that takes it beyond the rules.

Writer and illustrator:
 Calligraphies of the Desert, Saqi Books
 Calligraphies of Love, Saqi Books
 The Calligrapher's Garden, Saqi Books
 Calligraphie arabe vivante, Flammarion
 Désir d'envol, une vie en calligraphie, Albin Michel
 Sinbad le marin, trois voyages, Alternatives
 Si loin de l'Euphrate, Albin Michel
 L'ABCdaire de la calligraphie arabe, Flammarion
 Calligraphies d'amour, Albin Michel
 Le chemin d'un calligraphe, Phébus
 Hassan Massoudy calligraphe, Flammarion

Illustrator:
 Le vin, le vent, la vie, choix de poèmes,  Actes Sud
 L'histoire de Gilgamesh, Alternatives
 Toi, mon infinitude, Albin Michel
 Calligraphie pour l'homme, Alternatives
 Écrire la paix, une calligraphie arabe de la paix, Le Pouce Et L'Index
 L'harmonie parfaite d'Ibn ´Arabî, Albin Michel
 Calligraphie du désert, Alternatives
 Les quatrains de Rûmi, Albin Michel
 Le voyage des oiseaux, Alternatives
 La guerre sainte suprême de l'islam arabe, Fata Morgana
 Calligraphie de terre, Alternatives
 Le jardin perdu, Alternatives
 Antara, le poète du désert, 525-615, Alternatives
 Jouer à écrire en arabe - Graphisme, Concentration, Réflexion, Retz
 L'exil, extraits de "Consolation à Helvia, ma mère", Alternatives
 Un suspens de cristal, Fata Morgana
 Récit de l'exil occidental, Fata Morgana
 Le passant d'Orphalese extraits du livre "Le prophète", Syros
 Le vin, le vent, la vie, Sindbad
 Le Conte des conteurs, La Découverte

Translation:
 La voix de Schéhérazade, Fata Morgana

See also
 Islamic calligraphy
 Islamic art
 List of Iraqi artists

References

1944 births
20th-century calligraphers
20th-century Iraqi painters
21st-century Iraqi painters
21st-century sculptors
Abstract painters
Artists from Baghdad
French artists
French people of Iraqi descent
Iraqi calligraphers
Iraqi contemporary artists
Living people
People from Najaf